Thomas P. Hughes, S.M.A. was an Irish born Catholic prelate and member of the Society of African Missions who served as the Bishop of Ondo in Nigeria.

Biography 
Born in Hollymount, Co. Mayo, Ireland on 1 February 1891, 
son of shopkeeper Peter Hughes and the former Mary Cawny, Thomas studied at Ballinrobe C.B.S., after school he became a member of the Royal Irish Constabulary. During the Irish War of Independence, Constable Hughes was involved in Listowel mutiny, when he refused orders to kill suspects who refused to surrender,  which ended his position in the RIC and after this he decided to become a priest. Thomas was described in a later witness statement as 'a gentle and brilliant six foot athlete'.

He studied Sacred Heart college, Ballinafad, Co Mayo, then studying philosophy at Kilcolgan, Co Galway and joined the Society of African Missions, studying for three years at St. Joseph's theological seminary, Blackrock Road, Cork, before completed his theological formation at Dromantine House, Co Down, when the seminary moved in September 1926. Thomas was ordained a priest in June 1927, at St. Colman's cathedral, Newry by Bishop Mulhern.

The Prefecture of Northern Nigeria into two in 1934, one part being the Prefecture of Kaduna under Monsignor Thomas Hughes (and the other Prefecture of Jos under Monsignor William Lumley).

In 1943 Fr Hughes became Vicar Apostolic of Ondo-Ilorin, and when Ondo became a Bishopric in 1950 he became the first Bishop of Ondo.

Bishop Hughes brother, Patrick(Paddy) was also a missionary for the Society of African Missions, and their Sister became a nun, their niece Sr. Thomasina Hughes OLA also became a nun.

Suffering from heart problems, he resigned as Bishop, Hughes died in Cork in 1957, and is buried in St. Joseph's Wilton Cemetery, Co. Cork.

References

1891 births
1957 deaths
Roman Catholic missionaries in Nigeria
20th-century Roman Catholic bishops in Nigeria
Christian clergy from County Mayo
Irish expatriate Catholic bishops
Roman Catholic bishops of Ondo
Society of African Missions